Sneathia sanguinegens is a Gram-positive and anaerobic bacterium from the genus of Sneathia which has been isolated from humans.

References

External links
Type strain of Sneathia sanguinegens at BacDive -  the Bacterial Diversity Metadatabase

Fusobacteriota
Bacteria described in 1995